23rd Regiment may refer to:

Infantry regiments
 23rd Marching Regiment of Foreign Volunteers, a unit of the French Army
 23rd Regiment of Bombay Light Infantry, a unit of the British Army
 23rd Regiment of Foot, a unit of the British Army
 23rd Infantry Regiment (United States), a unit of the United States Army
 23rd Marine Regiment (United States), a unit of the United States Marine Corps
 23rd Arkansas Infantry Regiment, a unit of the Confederate States Army
 23rd Tennessee Infantry Regiment, a unit of the Confederate States Army
 23rd Connecticut Infantry Regiment, a unit of the Union Army
 23rd Indiana Infantry Regiment, a unit of the Union Army
 23rd Illinois Infantry Regiment, a unit of the Union Army
 23rd Iowa Volunteer Infantry Regiment, a unit of the Union Army
 23rd Regiment Kentucky Volunteer Infantry, a unit of the Union Army
 23rd Regiment Massachusetts Volunteer Infantry, a unit of the Union Army
 23rd Michigan Infantry Regiment, a unit of the Union Army
 23rd Missouri Infantry Regiment, a unit of the Union Army
 23rd New York Infantry Regiment, a unit of the Union Army
 23rd Ohio Infantry, a unit of the Union Army
 23rd Pennsylvania Infantry, a unit of the Union Army
 23rd Wisconsin Volunteer Infantry Regiment, a unit of the Union Army

Cavalry regiments
 23rd Dragoon Regiment (France), a unit of the French Army
 23rd Light Dragoons, a unit of the British Army
 23rd Virginia Cavalry, a unit of the Confederate States Army

Engineering regiments
 23 Engineer Regiment (Air Assault) (United Kingdom), a unit of the British Army's Royal Engineers

Artillery regiments
 23rd Regiment, Royal Australian Artillery, a unit of the Royal Australian Artillery
 23rd Field Regiment, RCA, a unit of the Royal Canadian Artillery
 23rd Field Artillery Regiment (United States), a unit of the United States Army
 23rd Coast Artillery (United States), a unit of the United States Army

Armoury regiments
 23rd Regiment Armory